The 2021 YellaWood 500 was a NASCAR Cup Series race held on October 4, 2021, at Talladega Superspeedway in Lincoln, Alabama. Originally scheduled for 188 laps on the  asphalt superspeedway, the race was shortened to 117 laps by rain. It was the 31st race of the 2021 NASCAR Cup Series season, the fifth race of the Playoffs, and the second race of the Round of 12. The race was postponed from Sunday, October 3 to Monday, October 4, due to rain. Bubba Wallace took his first victory in the NASCAR Cup Series.  It was the first time since the development of the 2014 NASCAR Playoffs format that a driver not in either level of playoffs had won a race, and the first non-playoff driver to win a race since the 2013 Talladega playoff race, as well the first win for an African-American driver in the Cup Series since Wendell Scott's win in 1964.

It was the shortest Cup Series race at Talladega Superspeedway, and only the fourth Cup Series race to be shortened at Talladega (the May 1974 race was shortened to 170 laps due to the Energy Crisis, the May 1987 race was shortened to 178 laps by darkness after catch fencing had to be repaired, and the July 1996 race was shortened to 129 laps because of a long rain delay and subsequent darkness).  It was the third of five national series races to be shortened in 2021 at Talladega.

Report

Background

Talladega Superspeedway, originally known as Alabama International Motor Superspeedway (AIMS), is a motorsports complex located north of Talladega, Alabama. It is located on the former Anniston Air Force Base in the small city of Lincoln. The track is a tri-oval and was constructed in the 1960s by the International Speedway Corporation, a business controlled by the France family. Talladega is most known for its steep banking and the unique location of the start/finish line that's located just past the exit to pit road. The track currently hosts the NASCAR series such as the NASCAR Cup Series, Xfinity Series and the Camping World Truck Series. Talladega is the longest NASCAR oval with a length of  tri-oval like the Daytona International Speedway, which also is a  tri-oval.

Entry list
 (R) denotes rookie driver.
 (i) denotes driver who are ineligible for series driver points.

Qualifying
Denny Hamlin was awarded the pole for the race as determined by competition-based formula.

Starting Lineup

Race

Denny Hamlin was the pole sitter for the race. The race was forced to be delayed until the following day due to rain. The next day, NASCAR would be able to get the race started at 1PMET, 12 PM local time. Chris Buescher won Stage 1 for his 2nd stage win of the season and the first since February at Homestead-Miami Speedway. At the end of Stage 2, rain hit the area. And the race was past its halfway point (Lap 94), so whoever was leading could possibly win the race. Bubba Wallace was leading when the rain hit. After a long red flag, NASCAR declared the race official and Wallace won his first career Cup Series race along with Stage 2 of the race. It was also the first win for 23XI Racing, the new team co-owned by Denny Hamlin and Michael Jordan which debuted this season.

Stage Results

Stage One
Laps: 60

Stage Two
Laps: 57

NOTE:  The final stage was cancelled.  By NASCAR rule, the top ten earned stage points at the point the race was terminated late in the second stage.

Race statistics
 Lead changes: 35 among 19 different drivers
 Cautions/Laps: 5 for 27
 Red flags: 2 (1 for weather, 1 for 18 minutes and 20 seconds)
 Time of race: 2 hours, 23 minutes and 24 seconds
 Average speed:

Media

Television
NBC Sports covered the race on the television side. Rick Allen, Jeff Burton, Steve Letarte and six-time Talladega winner Dale Earnhardt Jr. called the race from the broadcast booth. Dave Burns, Parker Kligerman, Marty Snider and Kelli Stavast handled the pit road duties from pit lane. Rutledge Wood handled the features from the track.

Radio
MRN had the radio call for the race, which was also simulcasted on Sirius XM NASCAR Radio. Alex Hayden, Jeff Striegle and Rusty Wallace called the race for MRN when the field races thru the tri-oval. Dave Moody called the action from turn 1, Mike Bagley called the action for MRN when the field races down the backstraightaway, and Kyle Rickey called the race from the Sunoco tower just outside of turn 4. Steve Post, Kim Coon, and Hannah Newhouse called the action for MRN from pit lane.

Standings after the race

Drivers' Championship standings

Manufacturers' Championship standings

Note: Only the first 16 positions are included for the driver standings.

References

YellaWood 500
YellaWood 500
Yella Wood 500
NASCAR races at Talladega Superspeedway